The Concert Artists Guild is an American musical institution, based in New York City and established in 1951. It is dedicated to discovering and nurturing musical talent, and helping musicians start careers. It provides scholarships and grants, and also runs the CAG Records label.

According to organizer Richard Weinert, “We begin with 350 musicians of any type or sort—vocalists, duos, instrumentalists, worldwide—whittle them down until 12 finalists remain, and from those, usually three or four are selected who have the combination of training, talent, and that extra pizzazz that is needed to have a successful concert career.” The three or four winners are then managed for several years, mentoring them in becoming successful concert musicians.

Hedge fund manager and philanthropist Roy Niederhoffer has served as Chairman of the Concert Artists Guild.

Winners

Winners of the Concert Artists Guild:
 1968 - Jerome Bunke (clarinet)
 1970 - Elaine Comparone (harpsichord)
 1971 - Daniel Waitzman (flute, recorder)
 1971 - Ani Kavafian (violin)
 1974 - Manuel Barrueco (classical guitar)
 1975 - Annette Parker (soprano)
 1976 - William Grubb (cello)
 1979 - Laura Hunter (saxophone)
 1980 - Rhonda Rider (cello)
 1981 - Frederick Moyer (piano)
 1982 - Alexander String Quartet (string quartet)
 1982 - Barry Douglas (piano)
 1983 - Thomas Gallant (oboe)
 1984 - Joseph Lulloff (saxophone)
 1985 - Douglas Walter (marimba)
 1986 - Marina Piccinini (flute)
 1987 - William Kanengiser (guitar)
 1987 - Håkan Rosengren (clarinet)
 1988 - Marie Luise Neunecker (horn)
 1989 - Marie-Pierre Langlamet (harp)
 1992 - Miami String Quartet (string quartet)
 1992 - New Century Saxophone Quartet (saxophone quartet)
 1993 - Mia Chung (piano)
 1994 - Jennifer Koh (violin)
 1996 - Joseph Lin (violin)
 1998 - Judith Ingolfsson (violin), Eighth Blackbird
 2001 - Imani Winds
 2002 - Peter Kolkay (bassoon)
 2002 - Michi Wiancko (violin)
 2003 - Tanya Bannister (piano)
 2004 - Soyeon Lee (piano)
 2005 - Parker String Quartet
 2006 - Brasil Guitar Duo
 2008 - Claire Chase (flute), Afiara String Quartet
2010 - Michael Brown (pianist)
2012 - Jay Campbell (cello)
 2013 - Ko-Eun Yi (piano), Donald Sinta Quartet (saxophone quartet), Alexi Kenney (violin)
 2014 - InMo Yang (violin) Fei-Fei Dong (piano)

References

External links
Official site
Concert Artists Guild video

Music organizations based in the United States
Arts organizations based in New York City
Arts organizations established in 1951
1951 establishments in New York City